The 2011–12 Ball State Cardinals men's basketball team represent Ball State University in the 2011–12 NCAA Division I men's basketball season. The team is coached by Billy Taylor and play their homes game in John E. Worthen Arena. They are a member of the West Division of the Mid-American Conference. They finished the season 15–15, 6–10 in MAC play to finish in fourth place in the West Division. They lost in the first round of the MAC Tournament to Western Michigan.

Roster

Schedule

|-
!colspan=9| Exhibition

|-
!colspan=9| Regular season

|-
!colspan=9|Mid-American Conference tournament

References

Ball State Cardinals
Ball State Cardinals men's basketball seasons